Worland
Don Worland (born 1932), Australian rules footballer
Gus Worland, Australian television and radio personality
Gus Worland: Marathon Man, an Australian reality television series
John Worland (1934–2012), Australian rules footballer, brother of Don
Stephen T. Worland (born 1923), American economist
Wilfrid Worland (1907–1999), American architect

English-language surnames